Togdan Rinpoche (born in 1938) was enthroned as the leader of Drikung Kagyu lineage of Tibetan Buddhism for Ladakh in 1943 and serves today as the Head Lama for all Tibetan Buddhist Lineages in Ladakh. Rinpoche is one of the most senior Lamas for the Drikung Kagyu and Nyingma lineages of Tibetan Buddhism.

In addition to being an accomplished spiritual leader, Rinpoche played an active role in politics from the 1960s when he was elected as the first leader of the Ladakh Action Committee, until 2003 when he resigned from his post as the Minister of State for Ladakh Affairs and Planning.

Appearance in documentaries and books 
Rinpoche has appeared in several documentary films including Yogis of Tibet and The Tibetan Book of the Dead: A Way of Life. Rinpoche can also be seen in a rare archive footage from 1965 in a Long Life Prayer for Dudjom Rinpoche, Rinpoche's root teacher.

Rinchen Terdzö 
Rinpoche is a lineage holder for the teaching cycle of Jamgon Kongtrul the Great, Treasury of Precious Treasures and sponsored one of the most important transmission of this cycle that takes up to 6 months to transmit in Tso Pema by his root teacher Dudjom Rinpoche in 1965. Rinpoche has since then completed several transmissions of this highly regarded teaching cycle.

Terma 
In accord with the Terma tradition of the Tibetan Buddhism and particularly the Nyingma order, Rinpoche is a Terton and have revealed the Padma Gyalpo's Heart Essence Sadhana, which have been recently translated into English and Chinese. The teaching cycle was authenticated by Dudjom Rinpoche during the time he was the supreme leader of the Nyingma order.

References

External links 
 Official Website of H.E. Togdan Rinpoche
 Lotus King Trust

1938 births
Living people
Kagyu lamas
Nyingma lamas
Buddhism in Ladakh